Guioa malukuensis is a species of plant in the family Sapindaceae. It is a tree endemic to the Maluku Islands in Indonesia. It is a vulnerable species threatened by habitat loss.

References

malukuensis
Endemic flora of the Maluku Islands
Trees of the Maluku Islands
Vulnerable plants
Taxonomy articles created by Polbot